GDQ or gdq may refer to:

 Games Done Quick, a semiannual video game speedrun charity marathon held in the United States
 GDQ, the IATA code for Gondar Airport, Ethiopia
 gdq, the ISO 639-3 code for Mehri language, Yemen, Oman and Saudi Arabia
 GDQ, (the Group Development Questionnaire) is a research-based survey based on Susan Wheelan’s model known as the Integrated Model of Group Development (IMGD).